John Lindsey "Jack" White (April 1, 1930 – October 9, 2001) was an American Republican Party politician who served in both the New Jersey General Assembly and the New Jersey Senate.

Early life
White was born April 1, 1930, in Camden, the son of John Rice White (1900-1980) and Jean Black Lord White (1903-1995). He grew up in Audubon, New Jersey and graduated from Audubon High School in 1948. He was a 1952 graduate of Franklin & Marshall College and a 1955 graduate of Temple University Law School.  He moved to Woodbury, New Jersey after law school. He served as the Assistant Gloucester County Solicitor.

New Jersey State Assemblyman
White was elected to the New Jersey General Assembly from the Gloucester County district in 1963 after Republican Assemblyman Joseph Minotty declined to seek re-election.  He defeated Democrat William G. Foster by 5,244 votes, 27,922 (55.18%) to 22,678 (44.82%). He was re-elected in 1965, defeating Democrat Francis J. Spellman, a former Philadelphia Inquirer and Gloucester County Times newspaper reporter, by 4,534 votes, 27,404 (54.51%) to 22,870 (45.49%).

New Jersey State Senator
White became a candidate for the State Senate in 1967, an election cycle that was less favorable toward Democrats (it was the mid-term election of the second term of Democratic Governor Richard J. Hughes). He challenged four-term incumbent Senate Majority Leader John A. Waddington in the Third Senate District, specifically within Assembly district 3A, which included all of Salem County and part of Gloucester County.  He defeated Waddington by 4,830 votes, 28,456 (54.6%) to 23,635 (45.4%).  Waddington won Salem County by 3,328 votes, but White's margin in the Gloucester County part of the district was 8,149.  He did not seek re-election to a second term in 1971.

Post-legislative career
After leaving the Senate, White continued to practice law in Woodbury.  He served as president of the New Jersey State Bar Association in 1985. He served as Solicitor of the Woodbury Board of Education and the Gloucester County Improvement Authority. White retired in 1996 after suffering a stroke, and died in Deptford Township, New Jersey in 2001.  He was 71.  Senator White is buried in Wenonah Cemetery.

References

1930 births
2001 deaths
American Presbyterians
Audubon High School (New Jersey) alumni
Burials in New Jersey
Franklin & Marshall College alumni
Republican Party members of the New Jersey General Assembly
New Jersey lawyers
Republican Party New Jersey state senators
People from Audubon, New Jersey
Politicians from Camden, New Jersey
Politicians from Woodbury, New Jersey
Temple University Beasley School of Law alumni
20th-century American politicians
20th-century American lawyers